Translohr is a rubber-tired tramway (or guided bus) system, originally developed by Lohr Industrie of France and now run by a consortium of Alstom Transport and Fonds stratégique d'investissement (FSI) as newTL, which took over from Lohr in 2012. It is used in Paris and Clermont-Ferrand, France; Medellín, Colombia; Tianjin and Shanghai, China; and Venice-Mestre and Padua in Italy. In June 2012, Alstom Group and the Strategic Investment Fund acquired Translohr for €35 million.

Description

The Translohr system is intended to provide a tram or light rail-like experience compared to regular buses or trolleybuses. Unlike other guided bus systems (including the similar but incompatible Guided Light Transit system developed by Bombardier Transportation), Translohr cars are permanently fixed to guide rails, and cannot divert from them, similar to traditional steel-wheeled rail vehicles.

Since the guide rail automatically guides the vehicle along its route, accelerating and braking are the only functions the driver controls. Like a conventional tram, power is provided by overhead wires and collected with a pantograph. The vehicle can also be run on internal batteries (arranged in packs) on sections of the route without overhead wires.

There are two main designs for the vehicles: the bi-directional STE series, and the unidirectional SP Prime series.

Translohr LRVs cannot run without a guide rail therefore they are not classified as buses. Hence, vehicles that are used on the Clermont-Ferrand network do not have license plates.

Criticism 

The Translohr system is more expensive than conventional trams or light rail systems, with higher building and operating costs. The  Châtillon–Viroflay Line in Paris cost €27.4m per km, including infrastructure, improvements of the right-of-way, and the purchase of 28 STE6 vehicles. In addition, due to the tyres constantly running over the same area of road, there is significant erosion of the roadway; this has already happened with Bombardier Guided Light Transit transit system, resulting in extensive repairs at significant cost to the operator. This adds to already high running costs. Ride quality is also said to be poor and is not much of an improvement over a standard bus due to the four-wheeled design, whereas trams have trucks (bogies) with shock absorbers or springs.

The Tianjin system suffered a derailment on 20 August 2007, three months after its inauguration.
There were five derailments on Padua's new installation in 2007 before its inauguration,
and one on 22 April 2010 due to a misaligned switch.

Where snowfall is an issue, this system may not be practical: since the guide rail forms the return leg of the electrical circuit, accumulation of ice and snow on the rail could cause intermittent power interruptions to the vehicle. Also, as the vehicle does not place a significant portion of its weight on the guide wheels (most of it being supported by the rubber tyres), snow packed into the flangeways or atop the rail by road traffic might possibly lift the guide wheels off the rail, leading the vehicle to go off course. However, since the guide wheels each grip the guide rail at a 45 degree angle and thus are at 90 degree angle to each other, the inconvenience may be minimal.  

Critics of the system also point out that, unlike a conventional tramway, Translohr is a proprietary system, meaning that once it is installed, a city would suffer vendor lock-in, or difficulties in buying vehicles from any manufacturer other than Lohr Industrie.

See also

 Bombardier Guided Light Transit
 CRRC Autonomous Rail Rapid Transit
 List of rubber-tyred tram systems
 Roll way
 TEDA Modern Guided Rail Tram
 Tram
 Tramways in Île-de-France
 Tyre

References

External links 

 Hondius, Harry: Translohr – Straßenbahn auf Gummireifen: Stand der Entwicklung. Stadtverkehr 5/2015, p. 8–12.
 Translohr official site
 Translohr 2.0 

Rubber-tyred tram
Bus terminology
Tram vehicles of China
Tram vehicles of France
Tram vehicles of Italy